The Minister of Defence is a senior member of the Italian Cabinet who leads the Ministry of Defence. The minister is responsible for military and civil defence matters and managing the Italian Armed Forces.

The first Minister of War was Manfredo Fanti, a General of the Royal Italian Army, while the first Minister of Defence was Luigi Gasparotto, member of the Labour Democratic Party; the current office holder is Guido Crosetto, of the Brothers of Italy party, who has been acting as Defence Minister since 22 October 2022.

List of Ministers of Defence
 Parties

 Governments:

Timeline

See also
Ministry of Defence (Italy)
Italian Minister of War
Italian Minister of the Navy
Italian Minister of the Air Force

References

External links
Ministero della Difesa, Official website of the Ministry of Defence

Defence

NATO defence ministers